Llaulliyoc (possibly from Quechua llawlli Barnadesia horrida, -yuq a suffix, "the one with the llawlli") is a mountain north of the Urubamba mountain range in the Andes of Peru, about  high. It is located in the Cusco Region, La Convención Province, Ocobamba District, and in the Urubamba Province, Ollantaytambo District.

References

Mountains of Peru
Mountains of Cusco Region